The Indian Super League is the top tier of professional football in India. The league was formed in 2014 as  a tournament until it was recognised as one of the first division leagues in 2017 with the existing I-League, later replacing it to become the only top division league since 2022. To date, there have been 73 head coaches (including interim head coaches) in charge of the 13 clubs which have played in the league.

Antonio López Habas holds the record for most games managed in the Indian Super League with 97, which he managed from 2014 to 2016 and 2019 to 2021. Sergio Lobera, who won 3 titles has been the most successful head coach in the Indian Super League. Habas and Steve Coppell has managed the most teams in the Indian Super League, having taken charge of three different clubs.

Many of the coaches listed below served as caretaker coaches in the period between a coaching departure and appointment. Few of these, however, went on to secure a permanent coaching post, for example, Khalid Jamil took over as an interim coach of NorthEast United in January 2021 and became the head coach of the team in the following season.

Head coaches
The list of head coaches includes everyone who has managed clubs while they were in the Indian Super League, whether in a permanent or temporary role. Caretaker coaches are listed only when they managed the team for at least one match in that period.

The dates of appointment may fall outside the club period in the league, for example, Albert Roca was appointed as Bengaluru coach in 2016 (before the club's entry in the league in 2017) and remained in his position through the club's introduction into the league.

By club

By nationality

Most games managed in Indian Super League
Current Indian Super League head coaches and their current clubs are shown in bold.

Successful coaches in Indian Super League

See also

 Indian Super League attendance 
 List of foreign Indian Super League players 
 List of Indian Super League club owners 
 List of Indian Super League hat-tricks
 List of Indian Super League records and statistics 
 List of Indian Super League seasons

Notes

References

 
Current ISL coaches
Indian Super League